Stephomyia is a genus of gall midges in the family Cecidomyiidae. There are about seven described species in Stephomyia.

Species
These seven species belong to the genus Stephomyia:
 Stephomyia clavata (Tavares, 1920)
 Stephomyia epeugenia Gagne, 1994
 Stephomyia espiralis Maia, 1993
 Stephomyia eugeniae (Felt, 1913)
 Stephomyia mina Maia, 1993
 Stephomyia rotundifoliorum Maia, 1993
 Stephomyia tetralobae Maia, 1993

References

Further reading

 
 
 
 
 

Cecidomyiinae
Articles created by Qbugbot
Cecidomyiidae genera